Söğütlü Athletics Stadium is a sports venue for athletics competitions in track and field located in Trabzon, Turkey.

It was built 2007 at Söğütlü neighborhood of Akçaabat town in Trabzon Province as a stadium with movable seating to host the 1st Black Sea Games. In 2011, the venue's stands were replaced by concrete ones with a seating capacity of 7,200, and floodlights were installed for the 2011 European Youth Summer Olympic Festival.

The stadium has two eight-lane tracks, one for warm-up activities. There are also two training halls, a fitness center and rooms for health care, doping test and press.

References

Sports venues in Trabzon
Athletics (track and field) venues in Turkey
Sports venues completed in 2007